The United Colonies of New England, commonly known as the New England Confederation, was a confederal alliance of the New England colonies of Massachusetts Bay, Plymouth, Saybrook (Connecticut), and New Haven formed in May 1643. Its primary purpose was to unite the Puritan colonies in support of the church, and for defense against the Native Americans and the Dutch colony of New Netherland. It was the first milestone on the long road to colonial unity and was established as a direct result of a war that started between the Mohegan and Narragansett Indian tribes. Its charter provided for the return of fugitive criminals and indentured servants, and served as a forum for resolving inter-colonial disputes. In practice, none of the goals were accomplished. 

The confederation was weakened in 1654 after Massachusetts Bay refused to join an expedition against New Netherland during the First Anglo-Dutch War, although it regained importance during King Philip's War in 1675. It was dissolved after numerous colonial charters were revoked in the early 1680s.

John Quincy Adams remarked at a meeting of the Massachusetts Historical Society on the 200th anniversary of the Confederation's founding:

Treaty

The full name of the 1643 treaty was "The Articles of Confederation between the Plantations under the Government of the Massachusetts, the Plantations under the Government of New Plymouth, the Plantations under the Government of Connecticut, and the Government of New Haven with the Plantations in Combination therewith". The colonies of New England were expanding and growing, and their contact was increasing with other European colonial settlements, as well as with surrounding Indian tribes. The New England colonial leaders, therefore, sought an alliance that would allow the colonies to coordinate a collective defense of New England. The New England leaders also felt that they were unique among the American colonies, and they hoped to band together to preserve their Puritan values. The treaty calls on the New England colonies to act as a nation, saying that they share a way of life and religion. This alliance was meant to be a perpetual mode of defense and communication among the colonies themselves and with any foreign entities.

The treaty outlining the alliance contained the following clauses, in summary:

The colonies should form into a league of friendship with mutual military assurance. This relationship would ensure the communal safety and welfare of the colonies and preserve their Puritan way of life.
The New England colonies were to maintain their current territory. Their jurisdictions would remain unfettered by the other members of the confederation, and any changes made would have to be agreed upon by the other members.
All members of the confederation were bound to each other if war occurred. This meant that they had to contribute to the war whatever they were capable of in terms of men and provisions. The colonies would also be obligated to provide a census of all their available men for militia. All men from 16 to 60 were to be considered eligible for service. Any gains from military conflict were to be divided in a just manner among the confederation.
If any member of the confederation came under attack, the other members must come to their aid without delay. This assistance would take place proportionally. Massachusetts Bay would be required to send 100 armed and supplied men, the other colonies 45 armed and supplied men or less, based on size and population. If a greater number of men or supplies is needed, then the commissioners of the Confederation would need to approve of the measure.
Two commissioners were to be chosen from each province to administer martial affairs. The commissioners were to meet once a year on the first Thursday in September, rotating the location among the colonies.
The commissioners would select a president from among themselves; he would not have any extra powers and would serve a purely administrative function. 
Commissioners would have power to draft law and codes that would benefit the general welfare of the Confederation. These laws would be to ensure friendly relations among the provinces and security for the Confederation. There was also to be cooperation between provinces in terms of the return of fugitives and runaway servants.
No member colony was to undertake any act of war or conflict without the consent of the others. This would be to prevent smaller provinces from being forced to engage in a war that they did not have the resources to fight. Any offensive war would need approval of six of the eight Commissioners. 
Four Commissioners could make administrative decisions in extenuating circumstances, but any decision would have to be within bounds of the pledged men and resources. No decision concerning bills or levies could be made with less than six commissioners present.
If any member province of the Confederation were to break any of the clauses, then the remaining provinces' commissioners were to meet and decide upon any further action.

The Massachusetts General Court and the commissioners from Saybrook Colony and New Haven Colony agreed to the treaty on May 19th, 1643. The General Court of the Plymouth Colony agreed to it on August 29.

Signatories
Massachusetts Bay
Increase Nowell, Secretary of the General Court

Saybrook Colony
John Haynes, Commissioner 
Edward Hopkins, Commissioner

New Haven Colony
Theophilus Eaton, Commissioner
Thomas Gregson, Commissioner

Plymouth Colony
Edward Winslow, Commissioner
William Collier, Commissioner

Commissioners

See also
Dominion of New England, an entirely different entity, 1686–1689
History of New England
New England Colonies
Old Swiss Confederacy
United Provinces
Hanseatic League

References

Sources

External links
The Articles of Confederation of the United Colonies of New England Settlements
New England Confederation

1684 disestablishments in the Thirteen Colonies
States and territories established in 1643
History of New England
Former confederations
1643 establishments in the Thirteen Colonies